Wharlest Jackson (December 7, 1929 – February 27, 1967) was an American civil rights activist who was murdered by a car bomb, with evidence of possible involvement by a white supremacy organization; it has been an unsolved murder since the 1960s. Jackson served as treasurer of the Natchez, Mississippi branch of the NAACP (National Association for the Advancement of Colored People) until his assassination by a car bomb, which was placed on the frame of his truck under the driver-side seat. The bomb exploded at approximate 8 p.m. on February 27, 1967. This supposedly occurred when he switched on his turn signal on his way home. The explosion caused serious damage to Wharlest's lower torso and he died at the scene. The scene of his death was six blocks away from the site where he was employed, at Armstrong Rubber and Tire Company. 

The culprit was never found, and while the FBI suspected the involvement of the Silver Dollar Group, an offshoot of the Ku Klux Klan, there was no investigation that came up with a conclusion or a culprit, despite the ten thousand pages of FBI documentation and evidence.

Background
Jackson was a Korean War veteran, married with five children, who worked at the Armstrong Rubber and Tire Company for twelve years. The company had several white employees who were affiliated with the Klan, and under pressure from civil rights activists, the company's management had offered more positions to African Americans and it also promoted Jackson to a more advanced explosives-mixing position, a position that had previously only been held by whites. The promotion was heavily opposed by his wife, but the pay of 17 cents an hour meant that his wife could quit her job as a cook at an all-black school and spend more time with their children. Exerlena Jackson, Wharlest Jackson's wife, later commented "I begged him not to take that job". Just two years earlier, the same circumstances had befallen a friend of the Jackson family, Metcalfe. He was the president of the local chapter of the NAACP and Wharlest worked under him as its treasurer. After receiving a promotion at Armstrong Rubber and Tire Company, Metacalfe got into his car and started the ignition, triggering a similar explosion which severely injured him. The Jackson family took him in and nursed him back to health until he returned to his job a year later. No one was ever charged for this crime either. The person who first came upon Wharlest Jackson after the accident was his son, Wharlest Jackson Jr., who recounted "When I made it to him he was lying in the street... his shoe was blown off and the truck was mangled". The cases are still in the backlogs of the FBI, and out of 109 similar cases, only two of them have ever been solved.

Wharlest Jackson 
Wharlest Jackson was born in Millers Ferry, Washington County, Florida on December 7, 1929 to Willie F. Jackson and Effie Jackson (née Washington). He lived on Vernon Road in Millers Ferry with his mother, father and his siblings Henrietta, Dora D, Ola Rea, Louis Robert, Warren, and Doris Lee until his mother died April 2, 1934. His father Willie was listed as a laborer on the family farm with his family in 1920, a sawmill laborer on the 1930 Federal census and as a farmer on the 1935 Florida census. His father later went on to become a reverend. In 1940 Wharlest and his siblings are listed on the federal census living with his paternal grandmother Henrietta Jackson and his uncles Martin and Frank Jackson. This census lists them as living in "The St. Luke Negro Settlement" in Millers Ferry.

Legacy 
Jackson's former home at 13 Matthews Street in Natchez was placed on National Register of Historic Places in Adams County in 2017. The PBS Frontline documentary, American Reckoning (season 40, episode 6), aired in February 2022, and looked deeper at the unsolved case.

See also
List of unsolved murders (1900–1979)
National Register of Historic Places listings in Adams County, Mississippi

References

External links
ClarionLedger story on Jackson's home becoming a national historical site
Wharlest Jackson's cold case

1967 in Mississippi
1967 murders in the United States
February 1967 events in the United States
Male murder victims
Unsolved murders in the United States
People murdered in Mississippi
Deaths by car bomb in the United States
Natchez, Mississippi